Mitchell Rales (born 1956) is an American billionaire businessman. He founded Danaher Corporation in 1983 with his brother Steven Rales and is the chairman of its executive committee. He is also the president of the National Gallery of Art since 2019 and established Glenstone, an art museum in Potomac, Maryland, with his wife Emily Wei in 2006. His net worth was estimated at 5.5 billion in March 2023.

Early life
Rales was born in 1956 in Pittsburgh, Pennsylvania. Raised in a Jewish family, Rales is one of four sons of Ruth (née Abramson) and Norman Rales. Norman Rales was raised in an orphanage, the Hebrew Orphan Asylum in New York City, and later became a successful businessman, who sold his building supply company in Washington, D.C. to his employees in what was the first employee stock ownership plan (ESOP) transaction in the US. Norman Rales was also a philanthropist, having founded the Norman and Ruth Rales Foundation and the Ruth Rales Jewish Family Service.

Rales grew up in Bethesda, Maryland, and graduated from Walt Whitman High School in 1974. He was a captain of their football and baseball teams. He earned a degree in business administration at Miami University in Oxford, Ohio, in 1978, and was a member of Beta Theta Pi fraternity.

Career

In 1979, Rales left his father's real estate firm to found Equity Group Holdings with his brother, Steven M. Rales. Using junk bonds, they bought a diversified line of businesses. In 1978, they changed the name to Diversified Mortgage Investors and then to Danaher in 1984. 

In the 1980s, the AM side of radio station WGMS was sold off to Rales, who converted it WTEM, a sports-talk station, in 1992. In 1988, he made a takeover bid for Interco, Inc., which was, at the time, the nation's largest manufacturer of furniture and men's shoes. He later ended the bid after five months with a profit of $60 million.

In 1995, Rales and his brother founded Colfax Corporation, an industrial pumps manufacturer based in Richmond, Virginia, and now known as Enovis. Rales is a major shareholder in Fortive.

Philanthropy
Rales has expressed a strong desire to spend his money philanthropically, saying to The Washington Post in 2018, "When we go, there's not going to be money bestowed on children and grandchildren in any meaningful way. This is about reallocating the money we had the good fortune of making to other causes." Rales is the president of the National Gallery of Art and is a former board member of the Hirshhorn Museum. He signed the The Giving Pledge in 2019.

Glenstone

Rales and his wife, Emily Wei Rales, developed and financed Glenstone, a contemporary art museum in Potomac, Maryland. The museum first opened in 2006 and displays the Rales's collection of post-World War II art, including paintings, sculptures, and both indoor and outdoor installations. A major $219 million expansion to Glenstone was opened in 2018 that increased both the gallery space and the wooded land surrounding the galleries. The museum is free and open to the public via online booking.

Personal life
Rales has been married twice:
Lyn Goldthorp Rales with whom he has two children. They divorced in 1999. Their son Matthew founded the grass-based livestock farm ‘Grassential LLC.’ 
Emily Wei Rales (b. 1976), the director and chief curator of Glenstone. They married in 2008.

Rales has three brothers: Joshua, Steven, and Stewart. He lives in Potomac, Maryland.

References

1956 births
Living people
American billionaires
Jewish American philanthropists
Jewish art collectors
Miami University alumni
People from Bethesda, Maryland
Danaher Corporation people
Giving Pledgers
21st-century philanthropists
21st-century American Jews
Walt Whitman High School (Maryland) alumni
National Gallery of Art
American art curators